Elián is a 2017 documentary film directed by Ross McDonnell and Tim Golden, produced by Irish documentary filmmaker Trevor Birney, and executive produced by Alex Gibney. The film details the story of young Cuban Elián González and features exclusive interviews with Elián and his family in Cuba and Miami, particularly Elián's father, Juan Miguel, and his cousin Marisleysis, who had cared for Elián while he was in Miami. The film was co-produced by Fine Point Films and Jigsaw Productions and features a voiceover by Raul Esparza.

Synopsis
González's mother, Elizabeth Brotons Rodríguez, drowned in November 1999 while attempting to leave Cuba with González and her boyfriend to get to the United States. The U.S. Immigration and Naturalization Service (INS) initially placed González with maternal relatives in Miami, who sought to keep him in the United States against his father's demands that González be returned to Cuba.

A United States district court ruling that only González's father, and not his extended relatives, could petition for asylum on the boy's behalf was upheld by the 11th Circuit Court of Appeals. Elián's father Juan Miguel comes to the United States to claim his child, and Janet Reno orders a pre-dawn raid to take the boy from the home of his Miami relatives in Little Havana on April 22, 2000. Elián returns to Cuba with his father in June 2000.

Elián grows up in Cuba and forms a friendship with Fidel Castro.

Release
The film premiered on April 21, 2017 at the Tribeca Film Festival. It opened in limited release in May, and was set to appear on CNN Films in August 2017.

Awards & nominations

References

External links
 
 Elián at CNN
 
 
 

2017 documentary films
2017 films
American documentary films
Irish documentary films
English-language Irish films
2010s Spanish-language films
2010s English-language films
2010s American films